These are things named after Anatoliy Skorokhod (1930-2011), a Ukrainian mathematician.

Skorokhod 
 Skorokhod space
 Skorokhod integral
 Skorokhod problem

Skorokhod's 
 Skorokhod's theorem:
 Skorokhod's embedding theorem
 Skorokhod's representation theorem

Skorokhod